Siquijor, officially the Municipality of Siquijor, is a 4th class municipality and capital of the province of Siquijor, Philippines. According to the 2020 census, it has a population of 28,915 people.

History
While Spanish priests arrived in Siquijor as early as 1780, it was not until 1794 that the town became a municipality, the same year the parish was established.

Geography

Barangays
Siquijor comprises 42 barangays:

Climate

Demographics

Economy

The major economic activities include farming, fishing, woodcraft and furniture making, basket making, peanut processing, banana chips processing, and bakery.

Transport
Although Larena has the larger port on the island, the harbour of Siquijor provides daily ferry services to Dumaguete in Negros Oriental. The island's only aerodrome, Siquijor Airport, is located in barangay Cangalwang wherein the only airline operating is Air Juan flying Cebu-Siqujor-Cebu route three times a week.

References

External links

 [ Philippine Standard Geographic Code]

Municipalities of Siquijor
Provincial capitals of the Philippines